Gomphus crassipes is a species of fungus in the genus Gomphus, family Gomphaceae. It is native to Spain and North Africa and possibly threatened by habitat loss.

References

External links

Gomphaceae
Agaricomycetes genera
Fungi of Africa
Fungi described in 1889